Hrastnik pri Trojanah is a settlement east of Trojane in central Slovenia. It lies in the Municipality of Zagorje ob Savi. The area is part of the traditional region of Upper Carniola. It is now included with the rest of the municipality in the Central Sava Statistical Region.

Name
The name of the settlement was changed from Hrastnik to Hrastnik pri Trojanah in 1952. In the past the German name was Hrastnigg.

References

External links

Hrastnik pri Trojanah on Geopedia

Populated places in the Municipality of Zagorje ob Savi